Reiherbach is a small river of Lower Saxony, Germany. It is a right tributary of the Weser in Bodenfelde.

See also
List of rivers of Lower Saxony

Rivers of Lower Saxony
Solling
Rivers of Germany